The 1956 United States Senate election in Kentucky was held on November 6, 1956, to fill the vacant seat left by Alben Barkley. Former Senator John Sherman Cooper was elected to complete the term ending in 1961, defeating Democratic former Governor Lawrence Wetherby.

Background

Alben Barkley served as U.S. Senator from Kentucky from 1927 to 1949 and Vice President of the United States from 1949 to 1953. After leaving the vice presidency in 1953, he was elected to the Senate for the term ending in 1961, defeating incumbent John Sherman Cooper in 1954.

On April 30, 1956, Barkley died of a heart attack during a speech at Washington and Lee University. Governor Happy Chandler appointed Robert Humphreys to fill the vacant seat until a successor could be duly elected to complete the remainder of Barkley's term.

Former Senator Cooper, who was serving as Ambassador to India, resigned his post to run for his old seat at the request of President Eisenhower.

General election

Candidates
John Sherman Cooper, U.S. Ambassador to India and former U.S. Senator (1946–49 and 1952–55) (Republican)
Lawrence Wetherby, former Governor of Kentucky (1950–1955) (Democratic)

Results

See also
1956 United States Senate elections

Notes

References 

1956
Kentucky
United States Senate
Kentucky 1956
Kentucky 1956
United States Senate 1956